The Lost Train also known as "The lost Transport", was the third of three trains that were intended to transport prisoners from the Bergen-Belsen concentration camp to Theresienstadt during the final phase of World War II as Allied troops approached the camp. The train was halted from further progress by the destroyed  railway bridge at the Black-Elster river near Tröbitz. The Jewish prisoners were discovered and freed by the Red Army.

History 
During the last weeks of World War II, the SS transported Jewish concentration camp prisoners on trains from Bergen-Belsen to Theresienstadt as the Allied front pushed closer to the concentration camp. Between 6 and 11 April 1945, three transport trains with a total of around 7,500 people, deemed Austauschjuden ("exchange Jews") by the SS, were selected to be taken to the other camp. The selection was based on Jews who had held a high position, and could be exchanged for German prisoners of war. About one-third were Dutch Jews. The prisoners from Bergen-Belsen concentration camp were put on three trains to be transported to Theresienstadt.Only one train reached Theresienstadt, due to a railway bridge blowing up outside of Tröbitz by allied bombing preventing the  third train from completing the trip. The first was freed by American troops at Farsleben a few days after departing Bergen-Belsen while the second  reached Theresienstadt,  The third transport would be the one known as the Lost Train. Once Theresienstadt was no longer reachable for the train, holding around 2,500 people, the guards fled the train outside of Tröbitz.  

It would not be until 23 April that the Red Army would discover and free the prisoners. Gradually, the guards abandoned the prisoners as Allied forces approached, leaving the Russians to discover a train car filled with the bodies of those dead and close to death, with several additional prisoners seeking shelter in nearby abandoned houses. Of the prisoners, 198 were already dead from malnutrition and disease; 320 additional people would die due to complications from exhaustion and disease. It was reported by the female survivors that some Soviets who rescued them had raped many of them, as the Nazis had done previously.

Unlike the other trains that attempted to relocate Nazi prisoners, this event had some unique characteristics. It was one of the few trains that carried exclusively Jewish prisoners; many of the prisoners on board possessed purchased passports of foreign countries; and the German Jews were listed as stateless under their nationality. 

Numbering among the survivors were Hannah Goslar, her sister, Abel Herzberg, Jaap Meijer, and his two-year old son Ischa Meijer, Jona Oberski, and Levie Vorst.

Legacy 
In 2015, the Brandenburg State Secretary for Culture, Marin Gorholt, the residents of Tröbitz began commemorating the lives of the lost immediately after the end of World War II. She made these comments while unveiling a €78,000 exhibit on the Lost Train. This was just one of several monuments and Jewish cemeteries commemorating the numerous victims of the Lost Train, in Tröbitz and other surrounding villages.  

The deaths would also be memorialized by Christian groups who set up a hiking trail along the final train's route.

References 

Bergen-Belsen concentration camp
The Holocaust
Forced marches
April 1945 events